The 2008–09 Supersport Series was the 13th running of the Supersport Series, the premier first-class competition in South Africa, and seventh since the introduction of franchise teams. Matches were played over four days, with each team playing each other twice, home and away, in a round robin format. The series started on 2 October 2008 and was played through until 2 April 2009. Nashua Titans emerged as champions for a third Supersport Series title.

Teams
 Nashua Cape Cobra in Cape Town
 Nashua Dolphins in Durban
 Gestetner Diamond Eagles in Bloemfontein
 bizhub Highveld Lions in Johannesburg
 Nashua Titans in Centurion, Gauteng
 Chevrolet Warriors in East London

Stadiums

Points table

Cricinfo

Explanation of points

Points will be allocated for each match in accordance with the system described below:

 For an outright win 10
 For a tie on a double innings 6
 First innings points Awarded only for batting and bowling performances in the first 100 overs of each first innings and retained irrespective of the match result
 Batting bonus points 1 point awarded on attaining 150 runs, and 0,02 of a point for each run scored thereafter.
 Bowling bonus points A maximum of 4 points to be awarded, one each at the fall of the 3rd., 5th., 7th. and 9th. wicket
 If play starts when less than 10 hours playing time remains, a one innings match will be played but no bonus points will be scored. The side winning on the one innings to score 6 points.

Table Notes
P = Played
W = Won
L = Lost
D = Drawn
Bat = Batting Points
Bowl = Bowling Points
Pen = Penalty Points
Match = Match Points
Pts = Total Points

Fixtures & Results

Round 1

 Toss: Dolphins, who chose to field first.
 Points: Dolphins 7.4, Titans 5.22
 Close of play:
 2 Oct day 1 – Dolphins 1st innings 11/0 (I Khan 6*, R Gobind 3*, 8 ov)
 3 Oct day 2 – Dolphins 1st innings 141/5 (JC Kent 34*, P de Bruyn 28*, 62 ov)
 4 Oct day 3 – Dolphins 1st innings 292
 5 Oct day 4 – Dolphins 1st innings 292 (110 ov) – end of match

 Toss: Lions, who chose to bat first.
 Points: Lions 17.1, Warriors 8.32
 Close of play:
 2 Oct day 1 – Lions 1st innings 240/9 (CJ Alexander 1*, GJP Kruger 0*, 83.2 ov)
 3 Oct day 2 – Warriors 1st innings 263/8 (JP Kreusch 39*, LL Tsotsobe 1*, 68.1 ov)
 4 Oct day 3 – Lions 2nd innings 274/9 (A Nel 26*, GJP Kruger 1*, 74 ov)
 5 Oct day 4 – Warriors 2nd innings 213 (58.2 ov) – end of match

Round 2

Round 3

Round 4

Round 5
{{Test match
|-
|date=6–9 November 2008
|-
|team1=Nashua Dolphins
|-
|team2=Gestetner Diamond Eagles
|-
|score-team1-inns1= 275/10 (86.1 overs)
|-
|runs-team1-inns1= Ahmed Amla 72 (103 balls)
|-
|wickets-team1-inns1= Dillon du Preez 3/71 (24 overs)
|-
|score-team1-inns2= 8/1 (4.2 overs)|-
|runs-team1-inns2= Imraan Khan 8 not out (15 balls)
|-
|wickets-team1-inns2= CJ de Villiers 1/5 (2 overs)
|-
|score-team2-inns1= 420/10 (159.3 overs)|-
|runs-team2-inns1= Ryan Bailey 150 (338 balls)
|-
|wickets-team2-inns1= Ugasen Govender 3/66 (40.3 overs)
|-
|score-team2-inns2= 26/5 dec (14 overs)|-
|runs-team2-inns2= Boeta Dippenaar 12 not out (39 balls)
|-
|wickets-team2-inns2= Ugasen Govender 2/11 (7 overs)
|-
|venue=Sahara Park Kingsmead, Durban
|-
|result= Match Drawn
|-
|umpires= Johanes Cloete, Karl Hurter 
|-
|motm= Ugasen Govender (Nashua Dolphins)
}}

Round 6

 Toss: Cape Cobras, who chose to field first.
 Points: Eagles 17.12, Cape Cobras 7.7
 Close of play:
 26 Feb day 1 – Cape Cobras 1st innings 17/0 (AG Puttick 10*, S van Zyl 7*, 4 ov)
 27 Feb day 2 – Eagles 2nd innings 43/1 (RR Hendricks 16*, RR Rossouw 24*, 13 ov)
 28 Feb day 3 – Eagles 2nd innings 320/6 (RR Hendricks 137*, AJ Pienaar 60*, 114 ov)
 1 Mar day 4 – Cape Cobras 2nd innings 246 (66.2 ov) – end of match

 Toss: Warriors, who chose to bat first.
 Points: Lions 8.12, Warriors 5.38
 Close of play:
 26 Feb day 1 – Lions 1st innings 61/1 (AN Petersen 26*, SC Cook 7*, 24 ov)
 27 Feb day 2 – Lions 1st innings 277/8 (AM Phangiso 5*, F de Wet 1*, 109 ov)
 28 Feb day 3 – Warriors 2nd innings 176/3 (A Jacobs 65*, AG Prince 56*, 56 ov)
 1 Mar day 4 – Lions 2nd innings 148/6 (32 ov) – end of match

 Toss: Titans, who chose to bat first.
 Points: Titans 17.52, Dolphins 6.56
 Close of play:
 26 Feb day 1 – Titans 1st innings 95/3 (GH Bodi 46*, F du Plessis 1*, 45 ov)
 27 Feb day 2 – Dolphins 1st innings 188/6 (M Bekker 4*, 41.3 ov)
 28 Feb day 3 – Titans 2nd innings 272/6 (PJ Malan 66*, P Joubert 3*, 67 ov)
 1 Mar day 4 – Dolphins 2nd innings 100 (37.2 ov) – end of match

Round 7

 Toss: Cape Cobras, who chose to bat first.
 Points: Titans 17.5, Cape Cobras 4.56
 Close of play''':
 5 Mar day 1 – Titans 1st innings 10/1 (BD Snijman 5*, 7.5 ov)
 6 Mar day 2 – Titans 1st innings 278/6 (P Joubert 8*, RE van der Merwe 13*, 104 ov)
 7 Mar day 3 – Cape Cobras 2nd innings 91 (52.4 ov) – end of match

Round 8

Round 9

Round 10

See also
 Supersport Series

References

External links
Cricket South Africa

South African domestic cricket competitions
Supersport Series
2008–09 South African cricket season
Sunfoil Series